Mulla Jakup Asipi (2 February 1951 - 6 January 2006) was an Albanian Mullah and commander of the NLA. He was the one of the most important religious personalities among the Albanian Muslims. His multimedia appearance in the last 25 years, especially after the 90s, has directly influenced the awareness of the Karadak region, both in terms of the Islamic religious and the national and patriotic aspects.

Life 
Jakup Asip was born in the village of Slupčane on 2 February 1951, he completed his primary education in his hometown and his secondary education in Damascus, Syria at the "al-Furkan" madrasa in 1980 . He completed his studies at the famous Al-Az'har University, in the Faculty of Islamic Religion in Egypt in 1985, while he continued his postgraduate studies in Beirut, Lebanon.

During the years 1985-1990, he worked as an imam in a mosque in Leverkusen, Germany, where he made a valuable contribution to the cultivation of religious, moral, cultural and national values. Aware of the situation in his home country in the 1990's he returned to contribute to the plight of the population. In his lectures, he was very precise and courageous, so he faced numerous threats and interrogations by the Macedonian police. From this period until his death, he organized over 5,000 lectures. During the war in Macedonia in 2001, Jakup Asipi became a Commander in the Kumanovo Karadak region and appeared as one of the main strategists in the organization and support of the war, because he was convinced that only through the uprising the people would be able to achieve their freedoms and rights.

After the end of the war in 2001, He was elected as the mufti for the municipalities of Kumanovo and Lipkovo. He died after a Car accident on 7h January 2006.

Works 
During his Lifetime he gave 600 lectures in audio and video on the Islamic religion.

References 

1951 births
2006 deaths